Zhang Jingkun (born 7 March 1973) is a Chinese beach volleyball player. She competed in the women's tournament at the 2000 Summer Olympics.

References

External links
 

1973 births
Living people
Chinese women's beach volleyball players
Olympic beach volleyball players of China
Beach volleyball players at the 2000 Summer Olympics
Place of birth missing (living people)
Beach volleyball players at the 1998 Asian Games
20th-century Chinese women